Pseudo Echo are an Australian new wave band that were formed in 1982 by the founding mainstay Brian Canham on vocals, guitar and keyboards. Other original members were Pierre Gigliotti (known as Pierre Pierre) on bass keyboards and bass guitar, and Tony Lugton on keyboards. Later members included Anthony Argiro on drums, James Leigh on keyboards and his brother, Vince Leigh on drums. In the 1980s, Pseudo Echo had Australian top 20 hits with "Listening", "A Beat for You", "Don't Go", "Love an Adventure", "Living in a Dream" and their cover of "Funky Town" (originally by Lipps Inc.), which peaked at No. 1 in 1986. In 1987, it reached No. 1 in Canada (No. 17 Year End), No. 1 in New Zealand, No. 6 in the United States, and No. 8 in the United Kingdom.

Their 1984 debut album, Autumnal Park, peaked at No. 11 on the Australian Kent Music Report. Love an Adventure followed in 1985 and reached No. 14. Their third album, Race (1988), peaked at No. 18. In 1990, the group disbanded. They reformed in 1998 and have issued four more studio albums but with less chart success, Teleporter (2000), Ultraviolet (2014), Acoustica and After Party (both 2020). Australian rock music historian Ian McFarlane stated that in the 1980s they "combined flash clothes, blow-wave hairstyles, youthful exuberance and accessible synth-pop to arrive at a winning combination ... and found a ready-made audience among teenagers who fawned on the band's every move."

Biography

1982–1984: Formation and Autumnal Park 

Pseudo Echo was formed in Melbourne in 1982 by high school friends Brian Canham on vocals, guitars and keyboards, and Pierre Gigliotti (as Pierre Pierre) on bass guitar and keyboards. They were later joined by Tony Lugton (ex-Steeler, James Freud & the Radio Stars) on guitars and keyboards. The group were named for a sound effect available on their keyboards and were initially influenced by New Romantics bands, Duran Duran, Spandau Ballet, and Ultravox. Molly Meldrum, television presenter and talent co-ordinator for the pop music series Countdown, saw the group at a gig and aired them on his show with a demo version of "Listening" in June 1983. Originally the three-piece group had used a drum machine until Anthony Argiro joined on drums in July.

The band were signed to EMI Records and "Listening" – re-recorded and produced by Peter Dawkins – was issued in November as their debut single. It peaked at No. 4 on the Australian Kent Music Report Singles Chart. Their debut album, Autumnal Park, produced by Dawkins and John Punter (Roxy Music, Brian Ferry, Japan), was released in June 1984, which peaked at No. 11 on the Kent Music Report Albums Chart. The album was released as Pseudo Echo for the North American market.  It was an Ultravox-influenced effort which yielded the singles "A Beat for You" (No. 12 in April), "Dancing Until Midnight" (June) and "Stranger in Me" (November). Another track from Autumnal, "His Eyes", was used in the horror film, Friday the 13th: A New Beginning (1985). In October 1984, Tony Lugton left the band due to musical differences, and was replaced by James Leigh (aka James Dingli) on keyboards. Lugton eventually joined synth rock band Talk That Walk.

1985–1987: Love an Adventure and "Funky Town" 

Pseudo Echo's second album, Love an Adventure, was issued in November 1985 and was co-produced by Brian Canham and Mark S. Berry. Another line-up change occurred after its recording with Argiro replaced by James' brother Vince Leigh (aka Vincent Dingli) on drums. The album reached No. 14 in Australia. Three of its singles reached the Top 20 including "Don't Go" (No. 4 in October), "Love an Adventure" (No. 6 in January 1986), and "Living in a Dream" (No. 15 in May). A fourth single, "Try" (August), peaked at No. 60.

In November 1985, Canham had joined a charity project to support research into little penguins, as a guest vocalist with other Australian artists and backed by the Incredible Penguins. They covered the John Lennon and Yoko Ono hit "Happy Xmas (War Is Over)", which peaked at No. 10 in December. Pseudo Echo released a rockier version of the Lipps Inc. disco song "Funky Town" (October 1986), which spent seven weeks at number one from December. James and Vince Leigh appeared in the music video for John Farnham's single, "You're the Voice" (September 1986) despite not contributing to its audio recording.

"Funky Town" brought Pseudo Echo their biggest international chart success, it reached No. 6 on the Billboard Hot 100 in the United States, No. 8 on the UK Singles Chart in July 1987, No. 1 in Canada, (No. 17 on Canadian 1987 Year End) and No. 1 in New Zealand. The international release of Love an Adventure featured a different track listing and included re-recorded versions of three singles from Autumnal Park: "Listening, "A Beat for You" and "Destination Unknown". AllMusic's Michael Sutton rated the album at four-out-of-five stars and praised its, "stylish, hook-loaded dance rock."

1987–1990: Long Plays 83–87, Race, and disbandment 

In 1987, the band re-released "Listening" for the movie North Shore starring Nia Peeples. In October, they won the 1987 World Popular Song Festival with "Take on the World", which provided a prize of US$10,000. They released a compilation album Long Plays 83–87, re-titled Funky Town - The Album in New Zealand, where it peaked at No. 1. Their third studio album, Race was issued in 1988. It was produced by Canham, Brian Malouf and Julian Mendelsohn, which had a more mature rock sound. It provided the Australian singles "Fooled Again", "Over Tomorrow" and "Eye of the Storm". The album reached No. 18 on the Kent Music Report Albums Chart and No. 32 on the ARIA Albums Chart. Pseudo Echo disbanded after touring in support of Race, in 1990.

Australian rock music historian Ian McFarlane stated that in their 1980s heyday they "combined flash clothes, blow-wave hairstyles, youthful exuberance and accessible synth-pop to arrive at a winning combination ... and found a ready-made audience among teenagers who fawned on the band's every move." Steve Huey of AllMusic observed, "[they] changed their musical style several times over the course of their career" including early "synth-rock, mixing elements of late-'70s disco" to "more dance-oriented sound with extra percussion" and finished by "playing melodic hard rock" in 1989.

1990–1997: Other projects 
After Pseudo Echo disbanded Canham moved into record production, including Chocolate Starfish's 1994 debut album, Chocolate Starfish, which peaked at No. 2 on the ARIA Albums Chart. Gigliotti joined All the Young Dudes with former Geisha lead singer Chris Doheny. The Leigh brothers had a stint backing Tina Arena before forming Vertigo (later renamed as Invertigo) in 1996 with a third brother, Gerry Leigh on guitar. In 1997, Canham formed Brill with Darren Danielson (ex-Chocolate Starfish) on drums. Andy McIvor was added on bass guitar and Dave Stuart on keyboards, and they toured as Brill, which issued a self-titled album in August 1997. In 2002, Canham along with Ben Grayson on keyboards and Matilda White on lead vocals formed a dance outfit Origene. They achieved success with their club smash "Sanctuary", followed up by "Suddenly Silently" (originally written for Pseudo Echo).

1998–2000: Reformation and Teleporter 

Pseudo Echo reunited in March 1998, with Canham and Gigliotti joined by Danielson on drums and Tony Featherstone on keyboards (ex-the Badloves), and toured Australia. In late 1999, Grayson replaced Featherstone on keyboards. In 2000, they released "Funkytown Y2K: RMX" which included six new remixes of "Funky Town". In February of that year, they supported international visitors Culture Club and Village People on the Retro Event of the New Millenium tour. In 2000, Pseudo Echo released a double-CD Teleporter, which was produced by Canham. Disc one has four new tracks and five re-mixed tracks, and disc two has live performances.

In 2005, Pseudo Echo toured extensively with Idols of the 80s and they released Autumnal Park – Live. In 2006 Canham performed at the Countdown Spectacular alongside an impressive gathering of Australian musicians.

In 2007, to celebrate the 25th anniversary of Pseudo Echo, Canham and Gigliotti were joined by previous members James and Vince Leigh for a sold-out show at the Crown Casino, Melbourne. This performance was followed by a short Australian tour before Canham and Gigliotti were rejoined by latter day members, Danielson and Grayson.

2012–2019: Ultraviolet and Live at the Viper Room

In 2012, co-founder Gigliotti resigned from the band and was replaced by Simon Rayner (bass keys, backing vocals).
In July 2012, Pseudo Echo recorded and released their version of "Suddenly Silently". This was followed by "Fighting the Tide" in 2013. 2014 saw them undertake a successful crowd-funding campaign which enabled them to release their 5th studio album, Ultraviolet. The band toured Ultraviolet extensively across Australia and to New Zealand. In January 2015, the group recorded a live performance in Hollywood's Viper Room in front of a sold-out crowd. This was released as Live at the Viper Room in June 2015. In December 2017, the group released a cover of "Nutbush City Limits".

2020–present: Acoustica, After Party, and 1990 The Lost Album Demos 
In May 2020, the group released their sixth studio album, an acoustic album titled Acoustica. They followed this in September of the same year with their seventh studio album, After Party.

In June 2021, the group released the album, 1990 The Lost Album Demos; a compilation of songs Brian Canham demoed in 1989 for what would have been Pseudo Echo's fourth studio album. The tracks remained "lost" until the original "master demo tape" was rediscovered by Canham in 2019.

Members

Current members
Brian Canham (born 3 July 1962) – vocals, lead guitar, keyboards (1982–1990, 1998–present)
James Mudd – keyboards, keytar (2018–present)
Matty Ray – keytar (2016–present)
Cameron Smith – drums (2017 (guest), 2018–present)

Former members
Pierre Gigliotti – bass guitar, keyboards, synth bass (1982–1990, 1998–2012)
Tony Lugton – keyboards, guitar (1982–1984)
Anthony Argiro – drums (1982–1985)
James Leigh – keyboards, keytar, piano (1984–1990, 2007)
Vince Leigh – drums (1985–1990, 2007)
Tony Featherstone – keyboards (1998–1999)
Simon Rayner – keyboards (2012–2016)
Ben Grayson – keyboards, keytar (1999–2018)
Darren Danielson – drums (1998–2018)

Discography

Autumnal Park (1984)
Love an Adventure (1985)
Race (1988)
Teleporter (2000)
Ultraviolet (2014)
Acoustica (2020)
After Party (2020)
1990 The Lost Album Demos (2021)
Ultimate (2022)

Awards and nominations

Countdown Music Awards
Countdown is an Australian pop music TV series which was broadcast nationwide on ABC-TV from 1974–1987 to present music awards from 1979–1987, known as the Countdown Music Awards.

|-
| rowspan="2"| 1983
| "Listening"
| Best Debut Single
| 
|-
| themselves 
| Most Promising New Talent 
| 
|-
| rowspan="3"| 1984
| Autumnal Park'
| Best Debut Album
| 
|-
| themselves
| Most Popular Australian Group
| 
|-
| Brian Canham (Pseudo Echo)
| Most Popular Male Performer
| 
|-
| rowspan="3"| 1986
| "Funkytown"
| Best Group Performance in a Video
| 
|-
| themselves 
| Most Popular Australian Group
| 
|-
| Brian Canham (Pseudo Echo)
| Most Popular Male Performer
| 
|-

ARIA Music Awards
The ARIA Music Awards is an annual awards ceremony that recognises excellence, innovation, and achievement across all genres of Australian music. They commenced in 1987 Pseudo Echo have been nominated for four awards.

|-
| rowspan="4"| 1987
| "Funky Town"
| ARIA Award for Highest Selling Single
| 
|-
| rowspan="2"| themselves for "Funky Town"
| ARIA Award for Best Group
| 
|-
| ARIA Award for Producer of the Year
| 
|-
| Love An Adventure| ARIA Award for Best Cover Art
| 
|-

Yamaha Music Foundation

World Popular Song Festival

References

  Note: Archived [on-line] copy has limited functionality.
  Note: [on-line] version of The Who's Who of Australian Rock'' was established at White Room Electronic Publishing Pty Ltd in 2007 and was expanded from the 2002 edition. As from, September 2010 the [on-line] version shows an 'Internal Service Error' and was no longer available.

External links 

Australian electronic rock musical groups
Australian new wave musical groups
Musical groups established in 1982
Winners of Yamaha Music Festival
Synth-pop new wave musical groups
1982 establishments in Australia
Musical groups from Melbourne
EMI Records artists
Musical quartets
RCA Records artists